Francesca Ekwuyasi is a Nigerian-Canadian writer and artist. She is most noted for her debut novel Butter Honey Pig Bread, which was published in 2020.

Originally from Lagos, Nigeria, she is currently based in Halifax, Nova Scotia. In addition to her writing, she had an exhibition of paper cutout art at Halifax's The Khyber in 2019, and has directed short documentary films including Reconcile and Black & Belonging.

Butter Honey Pig Bread was selected for the 2021 edition of Canada Reads, where it was defended by celebrity chef Roger Mooking. The book was longlisted for the 2020 Giller Prize, and shortlisted for the 2021 Lambda Literary Award for Lesbian Fiction, the 2021 ReLit Award for fiction, the Amazon.ca First Novel Award and the 2020 Governor General's Award for English fiction. In 2022, it won the Dayne Ogilvie Prize.

She identifies as queer.

References

21st-century Canadian novelists
21st-century Canadian artists
21st-century Canadian women writers
Canadian women novelists
Canadian women artists
Canadian documentary film directors
Black Canadian writers
Black Canadian artists
Black Canadian women
Black Canadian LGBT people
Canadian LGBT artists
Queer writers
Queer women
Canadian LGBT novelists
Writers from Halifax, Nova Scotia
Writers from Lagos
Artists from Nova Scotia
Artists from Lagos
Nigerian emigrants to Canada
Living people
Year of birth missing (living people)
Black Canadian filmmakers
Queer novelists
21st-century Canadian LGBT people